WRJW (1320 AM) is a radio station  broadcasting a country music format. Licensed to Picayune, Mississippi, United States, the station serves the New Orleans area.  The station is currently owned by Pearl River Communications, Inc. and features programming from ABC Radio and Jones Radio Network.

This station was at one time the sister station to WKSY before being spun off in the 1990s.

References

External links

Country radio stations in the United States
RJW
Radio stations established in 1990